Sep. 14 - Eastern Orthodox liturgical calendar - Sep. 16

All fixed commemorations below celebrated on September 28 by Orthodox Churches on the Old Calendar.

For September 15th, Orthodox Churches on the Old Calendar commemorate the Saints listed on September 2.

Feasts
 Afterfeast of the Exaltation of the Cross.

Saints
 Martyrs Maximus, Theodotus, and Asclepiodota, of Adrianopolis (305-311)  (see also: September 17)
 Holy Two Virgin-Martyrs, by the sword.
 Martyr Porphyrius the Mime, of Caesarea (361)  (see also: November 4)
 Great-martyr Nicetas the Goth and those with him (372)
 Saint Joseph, Abbot of Alaverdi Monastery in Georgia (570)
 Venerable Philotheos the Presbyter of Asia Minor, Wonderworker (10th century)
 Venerable Sabinus, a bishop who became a monastic.

Pre-Schism Western saints
 Saint Nicomedes, by tradition he was a priest martyred in Rome, perhaps under Domitian (c. 90)
 Saint Valerian, a companion of St Photinus (Pothinus) of Lyons in France (178)
 Saint Albinus (Aubin, Alpin), Bishop of Lyons (c. 390)
 Saint Mamilian of Palermo, Bishop of Palermo in Sicily (460)
 Saint Aprus (Aper, Apre, Epvre, Evre), Bishop of Toul (507)
 Saint Leobinus (Lubin), Abbot of Brou, then Bishop of Chartres (c. 556)
 Saint Hernin (Hernan), a hermit in Brittany at a place called Loc-Harn after him (6th century)
 Saint Merinus (Merin, Merryn, Meadhran), abbot of Paisley Abbey (c. 620)
 Saint Aichardus (Aicard, Achard), Abbot of St Benedict's at Quinçay near Poitiers, then Abbot of Jumièges (c. 687)
 Saint Ritbert, monk and abbot of a small monastery in Varennes in France (c. 690)
 Saint Ribert, Monk and Abbot of Saint-Valèry-sur-Somme in France (7th century)
 Saints Emilas and Jeremiah, two young men, the former of whom was a deacon, imprisoned and beheaded in Cordoba in Spain under the Caliph Abderrahman (852)

Post-Schism Orthodox saints
 Venerable Meletios, founder of the Monastery of Sergius.
 Venerable Nicetas, Bishop of Chytri, near Kythrea, in Cyprus.
 Saint Symeon of Thessaloniki, Archbishop of Thessaloniki (1429)
 Saint Nicetas, disciple of St. Sergius of Radonezh and founder of the Theophany Monastery in Kostroma (15th century)
 Saints Bessarion I (1490-1499) and Bessarion II (1527-1540), Metropolitans of Larissa.
 Saint Joseph the New of Partoёs, Metropolitan of Timișoara, Romania (1656)
 Saint Gerasimos the New, founder of the sacred monastery of the Holy Trinity in Sourvia, near Makrinitsa (c. 1740)
 New Martyr John of Crete, at New Ephesus (1811)

New martyrs and confessors
 New Hieromartyr John Ilinsky, Priest (1918) 
 Virgin-martyr Eudokia Tkachenko (1918) 
 New Hieromartyrs Andrew Kovalev, Gregory Konokotin, Gregory Troitsky, and John Yakovlev, Priests (1921)
 Venerable New Hiero-confessor Ignatius (Biryukov), Archimandrite, of the Aleksievo-Akatov Monastery in Voronezh (1932)
 New Hieromartyr Demetrius Ignatenko, Priest (1935)
 New Hieromartyrs John Borozdin, Jacob Leonovich, Peter Petrikov, and Nicholas Skvortsov, Priests (1937)
 New Hieromartyr Nicholas Tsvetkov, Deacon (1937)
 Martyrs Mary Rykov and Ludmila Petrov (1937)

Other commemorations
 Uncovering of the relics of St. Acacius the Confessor, bishop of Melitene in Pisidia (251)
 Icon of the Mother of God of Novonikita, carried by St Nicetas the Goth (372).
 Uncovering of the relics of Protomartyr and Archdeacon Stephen (415)

Icon gallery

Notes

References

Sources
 September 15/September 28. Orthodox Calendar (PRAVOSLAVIE.RU).
 September 28 / September 15. HOLY TRINITY RUSSIAN ORTHODOX CHURCH (A parish of the Patriarchate of Moscow).
 September 15. OCA - The Lives of the Saints.
 The Autonomous Orthodox Metropolia of Western Europe and the Americas (ROCOR). St. Hilarion Calendar of Saints for the year of our Lord 2004. St. Hilarion Press (Austin, TX). p. 69.
 The Fifteenth Day of the Month of September. Orthodoxy in China.
 September 15. Latin Saints of the Orthodox Patriarchate of Rome.
 The Roman Martyrology. Transl. by the Archbishop of Baltimore. Last Edition, According to the Copy Printed at Rome in 1914. Revised Edition, with the Imprimatur of His Eminence Cardinal Gibbons. Baltimore: John Murphy Company, 1916. pp. 283–285.
 Rev. Richard Stanton. A Menology of England and Wales, or, Brief Memorials of the Ancient British and English Saints Arranged According to the Calendar, Together with the Martyrs of the 16th and 17th Centuries. London: Burns & Oates, 1892. p. 448.

 Greek Sources
 Great Synaxaristes:  15 ΣΕΠΤΕΜΒΡΙΟΥ. ΜΕΓΑΣ ΣΥΝΑΞΑΡΙΣΤΗΣ.
  Συναξαριστής. 15 Σεπτεμβρίου. ECCLESIA.GR. (H ΕΚΚΛΗΣΙΑ ΤΗΣ ΕΛΛΑΔΟΣ).
  15/09/. Ορθόδοξος Συναξαριστής.

 Russian Sources
  28 сентября (15 сентября). Православная Энциклопедия под редакцией Патриарха Московского и всея Руси Кирилла (электронная версия). (Orthodox Encyclopedia - Pravenc.ru).
  15 сентября по старому стилю / 28 сентября по новому стилю. Русская Православная Церковь - Православный церковный календарь на  год.

September in the Eastern Orthodox calendar